This article lists the squads for the 2013 Algarve Cup, held in Portugal. The 12 national teams involved in the tournament were required to register a squad of 23 players; only players in these squads were eligible to take part in the tournament.

Players marked (c) were named as captain for their national squad.

Age, caps and goals as of 6 March 2013.

Group A

Germany
Coach:  Silvia Neid

Denmark
Coach:  Kenneth Heiner-Møller

Japan
Coach:  Norio Sasaki

Norway
Coach:  Even Pellerud

Group B

China
Coach:  Li Xiaopeng

Iceland
Coach:  Sigurður Ragnar Eyjólfsson

Sweden
Coach:  Pia Sundhage

United States
Coach:  Tom Sermanni

Group C

Portugal
Coach:  António Violante

Mexico
Coach:  Leonardo Cuéllar

Wales
Coach:  Jarmo Matikainen

Hungary
Coach:  Attila Vágó

References 

2013
squad